The 1965 Brabantse Pijl was the fifth edition of the Brabantse Pijl cycle race and was held on 31 March 1965. The race started and finished in  Brussels. The race was won by Willy Bocklant.

General classification

References

1965
Brabantse Pijl